Theerachai Ngamcharoen (born July 5, 1983) is a Thai former professional footballer who played as a left back.

Match fixing scandal and ban
On February 21, 2017 Theerachai was accused of match-fixing on several league games. He was arrested by royal thai police and banned from football for life.

References

External links
 Profile at Goal
http://th.soccerway.com/players/theerachai-ngamcharoen/291184/

1983 births
Living people
Theerachai Ngamcharoen
Theerachai Ngamcharoen
Association football fullbacks
Association football midfielders
Theerachai Ngamcharoen
Theerachai Ngamcharoen
Theerachai Ngamcharoen
Theerachai Ngamcharoen
Theerachai Ngamcharoen